Geisel may refer to:

 Ernesto Geisel (1907–1996), Brazilian military general and politician
 Orlando Geisel (1905–1979), Brazilian general and Minister of the Army, Ernesto's brother
 Dr. Seuss, pen name of Theodor Seuss Geisel (1904–1991), a children's book author
 Theo Geisel (physicist) (born 1948),  German physicist
 Geisel (river), Saxony-Anhalt, Germany
 Geisel valley, the valley of the river Geisel
 Geisel Library, the main library building at the University of California San Diego, named after Dr. Seuss

See also
Geisei, Kōchi, a village in Japan